Letting Go is alternative metal band Earshot's debut album, released on May 7, 2002. The songs "Get Away" and "Not Afraid" were released as singles during that year with each having their own music video. “Get Away” reached #4 on the U.S. Active Rock Charts and stayed in the top 100 for over 64 weeks. Letting Go reached #82 on the Billboard 200.

Recording
Vocalist/guitarist Wil Martin mentioned "we just played around town and recorded demos at like friends houses and studios and we only did that one time with one song which actually spawned all the label interest. And it's obvious recording in someone's basement to a multi million-dollar studio because you need the space and some of the technology to be able to pick up the various things and instruments."

Song meanings
"A lot of the songs are about relationships or about having a bad day, where nothing seems to go right, or where you just dwell on the negative. But the album as a whole is about getting past all that." - Wil Martin

Track listing
All songs written by William Martin, Scott Kohler, and Guy Couturier except where noted.

Personnel
Personnel per Tidal and liner notes.Earshot
 Wil Martin – vocals, additional production
 Scott Kohler – bass (credited but does not play)
 Mike Callahan – rhythm guitar
 Dieter Hartmann – drums
Additional musicians

 Todd Wyatt – lead guitar (uncredited)
 Guy Couturier – bass (all tracks)
Production

 David Kahne – production (all tracks)
 Jason Slater – co-production (2–11)
 Andy Wallace  – mixing
 Stephen Marcussen – mastering
 Greg Gordon – engineering
 Rob Brill  – engineering

Management

 Matt Aberle – A&R
 Mitra Darab – A&R co-ordinator
 Lisa Socransky, Esq. – legal representation (for Davis, Shapiro and Lewitt)
 Darrel Eaton – booking agent (for CAA)
 Rick Roskin –  booking agent (for CAA)
 John Jackson – European booking agent (for Helter Skelter)
 Michael Oppenheim – business management (for Gudvi, Chaprick and Oppenheim)
 InDeGoot Entertainment – management

Artwork

 Peggy Fee – cover model
 Greg Waterman – photography
 Lawrence Azzerad – art direction & design

Chart positions

Album

Singles

Appearances
 The songs "Get Away", "We Fall, We Stand", and "Headstrong" were featured in the video game Legends of Wrestling II in 2002. 
 The song "Get Away" was featured on the DVD Crusty Demons - Nine Lives.
 The song "Headstrong" was featured on the soundtrack for the film Queen of the Damned.
 The song "Ordinary Girl" was featured in the Xbox exclusive racing game Project Gotham Racing 2 in 2003.

References 

2002 debut albums
Earshot albums
Albums produced by David Kahne
Albums produced by Jason Slater